Alexandri may refer to:

People
Nicolae N. Alexandri (1859-1931), Bessarabian politician
Rabbi Alexandri, Palestinian amora
Sara Alexandri (born 1913), Russian artist

Books
Anabasis Alexandri, ancient Greek manuscript
Itinerarium Alexandri, Latin manuscript